The Barons of the Exchequer, or barones scaccarii, were the judges of the English court known as the Exchequer of Pleas. The Barons consisted of a Chief Baron of the Exchequer and several puisne (inferior) barons. When Robert Shute was appointed second baron in June 1579 the patent declared "he shall be reputed and be of the same order, rank, estimation, dignity and pre-eminence to all intents and purposes as any puisne judge of either of the two other courts." The rise of commercial trade in Elizabethan England occasioned fraudulent application of the Quo minus writ. More taxation demanded staff at the exchequer to sift an increase in the case load causing more widespread litigation cases to come to the court. From the 1580s onwards the Barons of Exchequer were no longer held in such low regard, and more likely to be Serjeants-at-law before qualification. The Inns of Courts began to exclude solicitors, and held posts for judges and barons open equally to barristers. In 1591, Regulations reflected a case in which the Lord Keeper Egerton banned solicitors from seeking cases in the Exchequer.

Together they sat as a court of common law, heard suits in the court of equity, and settled revenue disputes. A puisne baron was styled "Mr Baron X" and the chief baron as "Lord Chief Baron X".

They were originally the same judges as those of the Court of King's Bench, only becoming independent positions after the Exchequer's separation from the curia regis. In the early years of the Exchequer's existence, the Barons were the chief auditors of the accounts of England, a role passed to dedicated auditors during the reign of Edward II. With the Exchequer's expansion during the Tudor era, the Barons became more important; where previously only the Chief Baron had been appointed from the serjeants-at-law, with the other Barons mere barristers, it became practice for all Barons of the Exchequer to be Serjeants. This further increased the Exchequer's standing, since for the first time it put the Exchequer at the same level as the Court of Common Pleas and Court of King's Bench, where all judges were already required to be Serjeants. Prior to the changes of 1533, Serjeants held precedence over barons "sitting in the high court,...of great eminence". Thereafter they held the degree of coif to qualify at the Inns of Court as the senior court at Westminster.

From 1550 to 1579, there was a major distinction between the chief baron and the second, third and fourth puisne barons. The difference was in social status and education. All of the chief barons had been trained as lawyers in the inns of court. With the exception of Henry Bradshaw and Sir Clement Higham, both barristers-at-law, all of the chief barons who served Elizabeth I, had attained the highest and most prestigious rank of a lawyer, serjeant-at-law. By 1841, the equitable jurisdiction was transferred to the Court of Chancery, which deals with pecuniary cases.

History
By 1272, individuals were nominated to the office of Baron of the Exchequer from time to time: 24 baronial justiciers were appointed by the end of Henry III's reign. From 1278, there were three Barons, with a fourth being appointed in 1296 and a fifth in 1299. By 1308, one of the Barons was recognised as Capitalem Baronem (Chief Baron). Edward I commanded the Exchequer sessions to be held at Hilary term. By the reforms of the reign of King Richard II, barons were not necessarily qualified special pleaders or serjeants; office was in the gift of the king, and barons were not usually permitted to refuse appointment. From then until 1478, it was recognised that there should be four puisne Barons. One was frequently named as Second Baron and rarely appointments were named as Third Baron and Fourth Baron. From then until 1547, the three puisne barons were always appointed to numbered offices, but in 1549, Edward Saxleby as successor to John Darnall was merely appointed as 'one of the Barons of the Exchequer'. However, he and his successors held the office of Cursitor Baron. An additional Baron was appointed in 1604. The number of puisnes generally remained at three until the 19th century, but there was a fourth from 1708 to 1725 due to John Smith having leave of absence to attend to the office of a Baron of the Scottish Exchequer. A fourth puisne baron was appointed in 1830 and a fifth in 1868.

Puisne barons

1272/3–1283: Roger de la Leye
1272/3–1277: Hervey de Boreham
1273/4: Walter de Hopton
1273/4–1285/6: Roger de Northwood
1273/4: John de St Valerico
1274/5–1283/4: Philip de Wileby
1275/6–1299: John de Cobbeham
1283/4–1290/1: Peter de Chester
1284/5: William de Middleton
1290/1–1307: William de Carleton later Chief Baron of the Exchequer
1290/1: Peter de Leicester
1294–1312: John de Everdon
1295–1307; 1313–1320: John de Insula
1297/8–1307: Roger de Hegham
1299–1317: Richard de Abyngdon
1306–1307; 1324–1327: Humfrey de Waledene
1307–1310: Thomas de Cantebrig
1307–1308: John de Bankwell
1307–1323: John de Everdon
1308–1317: Richard de Abyngdon
1309–: John de Foxle
1310–: Roger de Scotre
1311: Walter de Gloucester
1311–1314: Walter de Norwich
1314–1316: Hervey de Staunton
1315–1320: John Abel (for a second time)
1316–1318: Ingelard de Warlee
1317–: John de Oakham
1318–1323: Robert de Wodehouse
1320–1324: Lambert de Trikingham
1320–: Walter de Friskeney
1322–1326: Roger Beler
1323–1327: William de Fulburn
1323–: Edmund de Passele
1324–1332: Robert de Ayleston
1324–1336: William de Everdon
1324–: Humfrey de Waledene 
1326–: John de Radeswell
Feb 4, 1327 – Oct 15, 1327: William de Boudon
1327–: Robert de Nottingham
1329–1331: Robert de Wodehouse
1330–1332: Robert de Aylston
1330–1344: William de Cossale
1331–1332: Thomas de Garton
1332–: Adam de Steyngrave
1332–: William de Denum
1332–: Thomas de Blaston
1332–1336: Robert de Scorburgh
1332–1334: John de Hildesley
1334–: Adam de Lymbergh
1336–: Nicholas de Haghman
1336–: John de Shordich
1339–1340: William de la Pole
1340–: William de Northwell
1341–: William de Broclesby
1341–1350: Gervase de Wilford
1344–1352: Alan de Ashe
1346–1348: William de Stowe
1347–1357: John de Houghton
1350–: James Huse 
1352–1356: William de Thorpe
1354–1375: William de Retford
1356–1365: Henry de Greystock
1357–1362: John de Bukyngham
1362–1373: Robert de Pleste
1365–1375: Almaric de Shirland
1365–1376: John de Stokes
1373–: William Gunthorp
1374–1377: John de Blockley
1375–1377: John Penros
1375–1401: Laurence de Allerthorpe
Jun 1377 – Oct 1377: Henry de Percehay
1377–?: Nicholas de Drayton
1383–1386: Robert de Plessyngton
1384–1403: William Ford
1389–1394: William Dounebrigge
1393–1399: Ralph de Selby
1399–1401: Thomas Ferriby
1399: John Staverton
1401–1403: Thomas de Tuttlebury
1401–1402: William Ermyn
1402–1412: Thomas Overton
1403–1423: Roger Westwode
1407: Henry Merston
1407–1423: Henry Somer
1410–1416: Richard Banke
1413–1422: Robert Malton
1421–1424: William Hesill
1423–1448: Nicholas Dixon
1423–: Thomas Banstre 
1424–: Thomas Banke
26 May 1426–1 Oct 1426: William Ward
1426–1435: John Fray
1435–1438: William Derby
1436–1453: William Fallan
1438–1444: Roger Hunt
1438–1449: Thomas Levesham
1444–1456: Robert Frampton
1446–1449: John Holme
1447–1449: Gilbert Haltoft
1449–1470: John Durem
1453–1461: Thomas Thorpe
1458–70; 1471–94: Brian Roucliffe
1460–1470; 1471–81: John Clerke
1462–1467; 1470–1471: John Ingoldesby
1467–70; 1478–83: Ralph Wolseley
1467–: Nicholas Statham
1481–1483: Thomas Whitington
1483–1494: Edward Goldsburgh
1484–1487: John Holgrave
1487–1502: Nicholas Lathell
1488–1504: Thomas Roche
1494–1496: Thomas Barnewell
1496–1501: Andrew Dymock
1501–1521: Bartholomew Westby
1502–1513: William Bolling
1504–1513: John Alleyn
1511–1523: Robert Blagge
1513–1522: Edmund Denny
1521–1527: William Wotton
1522–1539: John Hales
1523–1536: William Ellis
1527–1538: John Petit
1528–1532: John Scott
1532–1538: John Petit
1536–1542: Thomas Walshe
1538–1540: John Danaster
1539–1547: John Smith
1540–1549: Nicholas Luke
1542–1545: Lewis Fortescue
1545–1548: John Pilborough
1547–1550: Robert Curson
1548–1549: John Darnall
1549–1562: Edward Saxilby
1550–1558: Robert Brown
1559–1579: George Frevile
1562–1566: Thomas Pymme
1564–1572: John Birch
1566–1576: James Lord
1576–1577: Thomas Greek
1577–1579: Christopher Muschampe
1579–1586: Robert Shute of Hockington, co. Cambridge
1579–1606: John Sotherton
1581–1584: John Clench
1584–1587: Edward Flowerdew
1586–1594: Thomas Gent
1587–1607: Robert Clarke
1594–1598: Matthew Ewens
1598–1607: Sir John Savile
1604–1625: George Snigg
1607–1617: Sir James Altham
1607–1610: Edward Heron
1610–1627: Edward Bromley
1617–1639: John Denham
1625–: Thomas Trevor
1627–1631: George Vernon
1631–1634: James Weston
1634–: Richard Weston
1639–1642: Edward Henden
1645–1659; 1660–1670: Edward Atkyns
1648–: Thomas Gates
1655: Robert Nicolas
1656: John Parker
1657: Roger Hill 
1660–1675: Christopher Turnor
1663–1670: Sir Richard Rainsford
1670–1679: Timothy Lyttelton
1670–1673: Hugh Wyndham
1673–1679: Edward Thurland
1675–1678: Vere Bertie
1678–1679: Francis Bramston
1679–1686: William Gregory
1679–1686: Sir Edward Atkyns
8 May 1679 – 22 June 1679: William Leeke
1679–1680: Thomas Raymond
1680–1681: Richard Weston
1681–1684: Sir Thomas Street
1684–1685: Sir Robert Wright
1685–1691: Edward Nevill
1686–1688: Thomas Jenner
1686–1689: Richard Heath
1686–: Christopher Milton
1687–1688: Thomas Powell
1688–1689: Charles Ingleby
1688–1689: John Rotherham
1689–1700: Sir Nicholas Lechmere
1689–1696: John Turton
1691–1695: Sir John Powell junior
1695–1701: Sir Littelton Powys
1696–1697: John Blencowe
1697–1702: Henry Hatsel
1700–1702: Robert Tracy
1701–1716: Sir Thomas Bury later Chief Baron of the Exchequer
1702–1708: John Smith
1702–1726: Sir Robert Price
1702–1714: Sir William Bannister
1727–1736: Sir John Comyns
1714–1722: Sir James Montagu later Chief Baron of the Exchequer
1717–1718: Sir John Fortescue-Aland
1718–1726: Francis Page
1722–1725: Sir Jeffery Gilbert later Lord Chief Baron of the Exchequer
1725–1729: Bernard Hale
1726–1745: Sir Lawrence Carter
1726–1736: John Comyns
1729–1739: Sir William Thomson
1736–1738: William Fortescue
1738–1740: Sir Thomas Parker later Chief Baron of the Exchequer
1739–1740: Martin Wright
1740–1747: James Reynolds
1740–1742: Thomas Abney
1742–1750: Charles Clarke
1745–1753: Edward Clive
1747–1759: Heneage Legge
1750–1772: Sir Sydney Stafford Smythe
1753–: Richard Adams
1759–1761: Sir Richard Lloyd
1761–: Henry Gould
1763–: George Perrot
1772–1787: Sir James Eyre later Chief Baron
1774–1776: Sir John Burland
1775–1805: Beaumont Hotham, 2nd Baron Hotham
1776–1799: Richard Perryn
1787–1826: Alexander Thomson
1799–1800: Alan Chambre
1800–1827: Sir Robert Graham
1805–1807: Thomas Manners-Sutton, 1st Baron Manners
1807–1823: George Wood
1814–1817: Sir Richard Richards later Chief Baron
1817–1832: William Garrow
1823–1829: John Hullock
1827–1834: John Vaughan
1829–1839: William Bolland
1830–1834: Sir John Bayley, 1st Baronet
1832–1845: Sir John Gurney
1834–1855: Sir James Parke
1834–1857: Sir Edward Alderson
Feb 1, 1839 – Nov 29, 1839: William Henry Maule
1839–1850: Sir Robert Monsey Rolfe
1845–1856: Sir Thomas Joshua Platt
1850–: Sir Samuel Martin
1856–1876: Sir George Bramwell
1856–1860: William Henry Watson
1857–1873: Sir William Fry Channell
1863–1875: Sir Gillery Pigott

Cursitor baron

 1606–1610: Nowell Sotherton
 26 May 1610 – 18 July 1610: Thomas Caesar
 1610–1631: John Sotherton
 1631–1638: James Paget
 1638–: John William Page
 1638–1653; 1654–1685: William Barker of New Prison Walk and Hurst, Berkshire
 1640–1645; 1660–1663: Thomas Leeke
 1645–: Richard Tomlins
 1663–1683: Sir Clement Spelman 
 1679–1683: Francis Crawley
 1683–1685: Richard May
 1685–1688: William Carr
 1689–1696: George Bradbury
 1696–1697: Richard Wallop
 1697–1726: William Simpson
 1726–1729: William Thomson
 1729–1735: John Birch
 1735–1740: George Clive
 1740–1744: William Kynaston
 1744–1755: Edward Barker
 1755–1773: John Tracy Atkins
 1773–1824: Francis Maseres
 1824–1852: George Bankes

See also
 Chief Baron of the Exchequer
 Court of Exchequer (Scotland)
 Court of Exchequer (Ireland)
 Chief Baron of the Irish Exchequer

References

Exchequer offices